Hypoponera ragusai, is a species of ant of the subfamily Ponerinae, which can be found in many Asian and Oceanian countries.

References

Animaldiversity.org

External links
Images at Wikimedia

 at antwiki.org
AntKey

Ponerinae
Hymenoptera of Asia